"Too Young to Fall in Love" is a 1984 single by American heavy metal band Mötley Crüe. It was originally released on their 1983 album Shout at the Devil.

Background
Written by bass guitarist Nikki Sixx, "Too Young to Fall in Love" was released as a single in 1984 and reached #90 on the Billboard Hot 100 and #26 on the Mainstream Rock tracks.

The tune later appeared in the 2002 video game Grand Theft Auto: Vice City on the fictional in-game radio station "V-Rock".

Even though the song was a hit, it has been left off some of Mötley Crüe's compilation albums such as Decade of Decadence and Greatest Hits, though it would be included on the reissue of the latter.

Music video

An accompanying music video was released with the single.

The video concerns the members of the band coming together to rescue a young Asian woman from the clutches of the local Crime Boss.
Interspersed with footage of the band performing the song, the video also contains a fight scene where the band members fight Guards of the Crime Boss.
It is then revealed that the young woman has willingly submitted to being a consort to the Crime Boss prompting the band members to leave while shaking their heads in disbelief and disgust.

As they leave, Tommy Lee tries to sample some of the Asian cuisine in the Crime Boss's kitchen. The Chief Guard attempts to kill Tommy, but is knocked out using a heavy sack of grain.
Tommy then picks up a bit of the food and begins to eat it.
He then grimaces and spits the food out, walking from the kitchen in disgust.

Track listing
"Too Young to Fall in Love"
"Take Me to the Top"

Personnel
 Vince Neil - vocals
 Mick Mars - guitar
 Nikki Sixx - bass
 Tommy Lee - drums

Charts

References

External links

1983 songs
1984 singles
Mötley Crüe songs
Glam metal ballads
Songs written by Nikki Sixx
Song recordings produced by Tom Werman
Elektra Records singles